Shiroka Polyana is a reservoir lake situated in the Western Rhodopes mountains in Bulgaria.

The lake is situated 30 km south of Batak, on the road to Dospat. It is located 1500 meters above sea level amidst a forest of old pine trees. Different legends are told about the lake.
The shape of Shiroka Poliana reservoir is unique. Viewed from the ring-road it seems that the lake is composed of numerous small lakes with separate walls. This illusion is due to the indented relief of the lake bed that consists of several mountain gullies.

Although the banks of the lake are far from the road and comparatively hard to access, it attracts many visitors and sports fishermen because of the abundance of fish, including grey mullet, European perch, and trout.

Reservoirs in Bulgaria
Landforms of Pazardzhik Province
Rhodope Mountains
Tourist attractions in Pazardzhik Province